Cölestin II. Gugger von Staudach (or Coelestin, born 28 June 1701 in Feldkirch as Michael Anton; died 24 February 1767 in Saint Gall) was from 23 March 1740 until his death prince abbot of the Abbey of Saint Gall. He is regarded as one of the most important abbots in the abbey's late period. He is attributed the solution of different long-lasting conflicts of the abbey, amongst others that with the Bishopric of Konstanz.The construction of the now world famous Saint Gall Cathedral was initiated and supervised by Cölestin, albeit he did not live to see its completion.

Career 
Cölestin Gugger von Staudach was born in 1701 as son of city councillor Michael Anton Gugger von Staudach and Maria Oexlin. First he visited the Jesuit school in Feldkirch, but in 1719 he changed over to the monastery school in Saint Gall. On 16 October 1721, he took his religious vows as Benedictine, four years later he was already consecrated as priest. In 1726, Cölestin was moreover appointed professor of theology. On 18 October 1729, he travelled to Rome for study purposes and returned one year later with a doctoral degree. In the sequel, he held different offices in the monastery. Ultimately, he was elected abbot on 23 March 1740. He received the consecration on 19 September of the following year.

Father Bernhard Frank von Frankenberg, who had been Cölestin's rival in the election of the abbot, later became the Abbot of Disentis Abbey. Several times, Cölestin had to support him with staff and money, as the financial situation at Disentis Abbey was for a long time desolate.

Works as prince abbot 
When attempting to receive homage from his subject, it was denied him in Toggenburg. A number of unpleasant occurrences ensued. The Toggenburger demanded from the new abbot that he continue the negotiations about the crew right (dt. "Mannschaftsrecht") which had been granted them by his predecessor Joseph von Rudolfi. With the intervention of Bern and (although showing little interest) Zurich, the abbot managed to receive the Toggenburgers' homage in due form in 1743. The first negotiated solution regarding the rights of the subject territory, however, was only attained in 1755 - in consequence of pressure from France. The final solution would take four more years to be achieved.

In several other parishes, Abbot Cölestin Gugger proved skill in solving conflicts on the path of negotiation, for instance when people in Rorschach were trying to rebel against the abbatial governance - on grounds of false accusations.

Another conflict that Cölestin encountered was with the Bishopric of Konstanz. The Bishopric had for historical reasons - the Abbey of Saint Gall officially belonged to the Bishopric - the right to make visitations to the Saint Gall parishes. Saint Gall had for a longer time been able to shirk these visitations, but the formal eviction of one of the bishopric's judicial vicars from the country was the last straw that broke the camel's back and Konstanz complained. In the subsequent trial, first the court that was responsible for this conflict had to be defined. Saint Gall appealed to Rome, Konstanz to the Aulic Council in Mainz. Finally, the conflict was settled in Rome by means of the exchange of lands (to Konstanz) for rights (to Saint Gall). However, later on federal troops still had to restore order several times as Saint Gall and Konstanz did not want to adhere to the new rules and, for example, did not present a newly elected chaplain to the abbot, but, as before, to the bishop.

From today's perspective, Cölestin's most important works were his representative edifices. In 1746, he began with the construction of the granary in Rorschach. On 29 April 1757, he laid the foundation of his most significant work, the new construction of the Abbey of Saint Gall. The building itself was constructed in two stages and finished in 1767; the completion of the interior, however, took much more time. The abbey received its final consecration only in 1867, long after the abolishment of the monastery. Simultaneously with the abbey, Cölestin also had a new library built. The baroque hall of the abbey library of Saint Gall is reckoned one of the world's most beautiful profane halls. Together, the abbey and the library cost 457'929 guilder. Cölestin was also an able businessman who knew how to skilfully utilise the abbey's sources of money. Despite the significant expenses of his construction work as well as trials and jura regalia, he was able to pay back the entire debt that he had inherited from his predecessor and furthermore bequeath his successor 180'600 guilder in cash and 57'695 guilder as capital.

Historical account 
Ildefons von Arx writes about Cölestin Gugger von Staudach:

External links 

 Cölestin Gugger von Staudach on the website of the Stiftsarchiv St. Gallen.
 Cölestin Gugger von Staudach in the Stadtlexikon Wil. Quoted after Duft, Johannes: Die Abtei St. Gallen.
 Vogler, Werner. 2007: "Cölestin Gugger von Staudach". Historisches Lexikon der Schweiz.

Reading list 

 Von Arx, Ildefons: Geschichten des Kantons St. Gallen. Zollikofer & Züblin, St. Gallen 1813, p. 566 et sqq.

1701 births
1767 deaths

18th-century Swiss people
Abbots of Saint Gall